How It Feels to Be Run Over is a one-minute British silent film, made in 1900, and directed by Cecil M. Hepworth. As in other instances of the very earliest films, the film presents the audience with the images of a shocking experience, without further narrative exposition.

Plot summary 
A coach is coming, and moves out of the frame at one side of the field of view. Soon after, an approaching car veers off course and moves straight to the viewer (the camera). As it approaches, the occupants wave frantically, hoping to stave off the impending collision. At the moment the car fills the entire frame the film cuts to title cards that bear the text "Oh, mother will be pleased".

Cast 
 Cecil Hepworth as Driver
 May Clark as Passenger
 Several actors as passengers

Missing Intertitle
In the original film, the intertitle says, "Oh, mother will be pleased". When the footage was found, it was missing the "Mother" intertitle. It just read, "Oh, will be pleased."

See also
 Explosion of a Motor Car, another 1900 Hepworth film involving an automobile

References

External links

Further reading
Tanya Shilina-Conte, "How It Feels: Black Screen as Negative Event in Early Cinema and 9/11 Films." Special Issue on “Film and Phenomenology.” Studia Phaenomenologica 16 (2016): 401-30.

1900 films
British silent short films
British black-and-white films